The following is a list of notable architects from Finland.

A–M

 Aino Aalto
 Alvar Aalto
 Waldemar Aspelin
 Pauli E. Blomstedt
 Erik Bryggman
 Marco Casagrande
 Hilding Ekelund
 Aarne Ervi
 Kristian Gullichsen
 Mikko Heikkinen
 Vilhelm Helander
 Signe Hornborg 
 Aarne Hytönen
 Markku Komonen
 Juha Leiviskä
 Risto-Veikko Luukkonen
 Rainer Mahlamäki

N–Z

 Usko Nyström
 Simo Paavilainen
 Juhani Pallasmaa
 Timo Penttilä
 Raili Pietilä
 Reima Pietilä
 Viljo Revell
 Aarno Ruusuvuori
 Eero Saarinen
 Eliel Saarinen
 Heikki Siren
 J. S. Sirén
 Kaija Siren
 Lars Sonck
 Matti Suuronen
 Jaakko Tähtinen
 Einari Teräsvirta
 Martti Välikangas
 Waldemar Wilenius

See also

 List of architects
 List of Finns

Finnish
Architects